Cellana strigilis chathamensis is a subspecies of large limpet, a marine gastropod mollusc in the family Patellidae, one of the families of true limpets.

References

 Powell A. W. B., New Zealand Mollusca, William Collins Publishers Ltd, Auckland 1979 

Nacellidae
Gastropods of New Zealand